Rapped in Romance is the second and final studio album by American Los Angeles-based electro-hop group the World Class Wreckin' Cru. It was released in 1986 on Epic. Cli-N-Tel left the group during the fall of 1985 which led to Lonzo recruiting Shakespeare to join the group.

After this album, Dr. Dre and DJ Yella left the group, leading to the formation of  gangsta rap group N.W.A, while Lonzo Williams would form a new Wreckin Cru and enjoy some moderate mainstream success with the song "Turn Off The Lights".

Track listing

Personnel
Alonzo Williams - vocals, producer, mixing
Andre Young - vocals, producer, drum programming, keyboards, scratches, mixing
Antoine Carraby - vocals, co-producer, drum programming, keyboards, percussion, scratches, mixing
Bernard Severe - vocals, co-producer, keyboards, mixing
Mona Lisa Young - vocals
Keypunch - keyboards
Larkin Arnold - executive producer
Bernie Grundman - mastering
Donovan Smith - mixing
Penny Wolin - photography

References

1986 albums
Epic Records albums
World Class Wreckin' Cru albums
Albums produced by Dr. Dre
Albums produced by DJ Yella